Kuttyedathi Vilasini is an Indian actress best known for her work in Malayalam cinema. She has acted in more than 400 films and 120 tv serials.

Biography
Kuttyedathi Vilasini was born in Thrissur, Kerala. Her portrayal of Kuttyedathi in the movie of same title, by M. T. Vasudevan Nair won her prefix for her name. She received Kerala State film Award for Second Best Actress in 1976 for Dweep.

Awards
 1976 Kerala State Film Award for Second Best Actress –  	Dweepu
 2011 Nadaka Prathibha Award by United Dramatic Academy (U.D.A)
 2011 Nilambur Balan award

Filmography

 Paanapaathram
 Vellaramkunnile Vellimeenukal
 Pularkkalam
Madhaveeyam (2019) as Chechiyamma
Angu Doore Oru Deshathu (2018) as
 Tharangal (2014) as herself, photo only
 Vazhiyariyaathe (2013)
 Mizhi (2013)
 Bioscope (2008) as Ammini
 Margam (2003) as Kathreenamma
 Mayilpeelithalu (2002)
 Indraneelakkallu (2002)
 Ente Hridayathinte Udama (2002)
 Payyan (2001)
 Theerthadanam (2001) as Parukutti
 Kinnara Thumbikal(2000) as Janaki
 Unnimaya (2000)
 The Godman (1999)
 Rushy Vamsam (1999)
 Kannezhuthi Pottum Thottu (1999) as Moosakutty's mother
 Kottaram Veettile Apputtan  (1998) as Kunjulakshmi Amma
 Baalappattangal 
 Shobhanam (1997)
 Moksham (1997)
 Ishtadanam (1997) as Naani 
 Kudumbakodathy (1996) as Chandramathi
 Mookkilla Rajyathu Murimookkan Rajavu (1996)
 Oru Abhibhashakante Case Diary (1996)
 Agnidevan (1995)
 Mannar Mathai Speaking (1995) as Sakunthala's mother
Sukrutham (1994)
 Nandhni Oppol (1994)
 Aayirappara (1993)
 Manichitrathazhu (1993) as Thampi's wife
 Mithunam (1993) as Shyama's  kunjamma
 Sthalathe Pradhana Payyans (1993)
 Tharavadu (1992)
 Kadathanadan Ambadi (1990)
 Vembanaad (1990)
 Arhatha (1990)
 Ore Thooval Pakshikal(1988)
 Rithubedam (1987)
 Chanthayil Choodi Vilkkunna Pennu (1987)
 Naalkkavala (1987)
 Neram Pularumbol (1986)
 Meenamasathile Sooran (1986)
 Mounanombaram (1985) as Sathi's mother
 Thacholi Thankappan (1984) as Devu
 Ivide Thudangunnu (1984) as Babu's mother
 Astapadi (1983) as Kavamma
 Appunni (1984) as Kalyaniyamma
 Athirathram (1984)
 Ulppathi (1984)
 Swantham Sarika (1984) as Basheer's mother
 Swarna Gopuram (1984) 
 Visa (1983) as Nalini's mother
 Father Damien (1983)
 Surumayitta Kannukal (1983)
 Vaarikkuzhi (1982)
 Yavanika (1982)
 Gaanam (1982)
 Ponmudy (1982) as Radhamma
 Thraasam (1981)
 Orikkalkkoodi (1981)
 Ahimsa (1981) as Lakshmi
 Ashwaradham (1980) as Ammu
 Angadi (1980) as Khadeeja
 Kummaatti (1979)
 Ottapettavar (1979)
 Hridayathil Nee Mathram (1979)
 Kanalattam (1979)
 Thenthulli (1979)
 Manninte Maaril (1979)
 Thanal (1978)
 Agni (1978)
 Kodiyettam (1978) as Sarojini
 Choondakkari (1977)
 Taxi Driver (1977)
 Dweepu (1977)
 Poonthenaruvi (1974) as Lakshmi 
 Maasappadi Maathupilla (1973) as Aalkkoottathil Eliyamma
 Chukku (1973) as Mary
 Panimudakku (1972) as Dakshyayani
 Kuttyedathi (1971) as Malu
 Kadalpalam (1969) 
 Aalmaram (1969)
 Kunhali Marakkar (1967)
 Thacholi Othenan (1964)
 Palattu Koman (1962)

Plays
 Pooja
 Srishti
 Kunthi
 Madangal Garjikkunnu
 Samasya
 Vellakuthirakal
 Kasthooriman
 MLA
 Sthithi
 Samharam (The Annihilation)
 Sakshatkaram (The Fulfillment)
 Samanwayam (The Union)

TV serials
2018-Neelakkuyil (TV series) (Asianet)
2017-Vanambadi (TV series) (Asianet)
 2016-Aluvayum Mathikkariyum (Asianet Plus)
2016- Athmasakhi (Mazhavil Manorama)
Mayamadhavam (Surya TV)
2006-Nombarappoovu (Asianet)
2005-Pavakoothu (Amrita TV)
2005- Kadamattathu Kathanar (Asianet)
2004- Sthree Oru Santhwanam (Asianet)
2002–2003- Akkarapacha (Asianet)
Thaali
Jwalayai
Pakida Pakida Pambaram
Angadipattu

Album
 Sreekrishna Jyothi

References

External links

Kuttiyedathi Vilasini at MSI
 http://www.thehindu.com/todays-paper/tp-national/tp-kerala/award-for-kuttyedathi-vilasini/article1151714.ece
 http://oldmalayalamcinema.wordpress.com/tag/kuttyedathi-vilasini/
 http://www.malayalachalachithram.com/movieslist.php?a=5734

Kerala State Film Award winners
Actresses in Malayalam cinema
Indian film actresses
Actresses from Thrissur
Living people
20th-century Indian actresses
21st-century Indian actresses
Indian television actresses
Actresses in Malayalam television
Year of birth missing (living people)